Tall Hopes is an American sitcom television series created by Michael Elias and Rich Eustis. The series stars George Wallace, Anna Maria Horsford, Kenn Michael, Terrence Howard and Karla Green. The series aired on CBS from August 25 to September 8, 1993.

Cast  
George Wallace as George Harris
Anna Maria Horsford as Lainie Harris
Kenn Michael as Ernest Harris
Terrence Howard as Chester Harris
Karla Green as DeeDee Harris

Episodes

References

External links
 

1990s American sitcoms
1993 American television series debuts
1993 American television series endings
English-language television shows
CBS original programming
Television series about families
Television series by Warner Bros. Television Studios
Television shows set in Philadelphia